Thenalidine is an antihistamine with anticholinergic properties used as an antipruritic drug.  It was withdrawn from the US, Canadian, and UK markets in 1963 due to a risk of neutropenia.

References 

H1 receptor antagonists
Piperidines
Thiophenes
Anilines
Withdrawn drugs